Hiral Vyas Tipirneni (born September 28, 1967) is an Indian-American politician and physician. She worked for 10 years in Phoenix, Arizona area Emergency Departments, is a cancer research advocate, and serves on the board of directors of the Maricopa Health Foundation. In 2018, she was the Democratic nominee for special election for Arizona's 8th congressional district, which was called to fill the congressional seat after former GOP Representative Trent Franks resigned following a sexual misconduct scandal.

Tipirneni won a special primary election on February 27, 2018, and was defeated by Republican nominee Debbie Lesko in the general election on April 24, 2018. However, she managed to lower the Republican margin of victory by over 16 percentage points. Tipirneni was defeated again in the regular election in November 2018 by an eleven-point margin.

Tipirneni ran again in the 2020 United States House of Representatives elections in Arizona as the Democratic nominee for Arizona's 6th congressional district, a suburban district that was more Democratic-leaning than Arizona's 8th. She lost to the incumbent David Schweikert with 47.8% of the vote.

Early life and education 
Tipirneni was born in Mumbai, India, and in 1971, aged 3, with her parents, immigrated to the United States, and settled in Cleveland, Ohio.

Tipirneni earned her Doctor of Medicine degree from Northeast Ohio Medical University.

Medical career 
Following graduation from medical school, Tipirneni became chief resident in the University of Michigan Health System's Emergency Department, and later became a member of the Board of Directors of Maricopa Health Foundation, the fund-raising arm of the Maricopa Integrated Health System.

Electoral history

2018 congressional special election 

In August 2017, Tipirneni, a Democrat, announced her candidacy for the congressional seat representing the 8th district then held by Republican Trent Franks. She later entered the race in the special election for Arizona's 8th congressional district, following Franks' resignation amidst numerous claims of sexual misbehavior with female staffers. Tipirneni defeated Brianna Westbrook in the special primary election on Tuesday, February 27, 2018.

General election 
She faced Debbie Lesko in the general election on Tuesday, April 24, 2018. Tipirneni has garnered some national support including endorsements from End Citizens United and Gabby Giffords, the former congresswoman from Arizona. However, she has received little support from national Democratic campaign groups. Although a relative newcomer to politics, she has been successful in raising more campaign funds than her opponent and is also outspending Lesko in television ads. A poll published by Emerson College on April 16 had Tipirneni with "a slight lead, 46 percent to 45 percent". Another poll published by Lake Research Partners had the candidates tied at 44 to 44.

Tipirneni lost by a relatively small margin in a district that has historically leaned heavily towards her opponent's party. She earned 47.6% of the vote to Lesko's 52.4% in a district that voted for President Donald Trump by a 21% margin. Tipirneni planned to run again in the regular elections in November 2018.

2018 congressional general election

Tipirneni won the otherwise uncontested Democratic primary. She was defeated for a second time by Debbie Lesko, getting 44.5% of the vote to Lesko's 55.5%.

2020 congressional general election

Tipirneni won a four-way Democratic primary with 53.2% of the vote. She then lost the general election to the incumbent David Schweikert, getting 47.8% of the vote to Schweikert's 52.2%.

After election night, Tipirneni sent out a fundraising email asking for funds to ensure her supporters' votes were counted, drawing widespread criticism that she was attempting to undermine faith in the election, and comparisons to Martha McSally and Donald Trump.

Political positions 
Her campaign has focused on issues related to health care, education, and retirement security, and emphasizes her "data-driven approach" to public policy. Tipirneni also advocates for "commonsense" gun control measures, comprehensive immigration reform, and a public health insurance option. Tipirneni also agrees that Americans have the Second Amendment right to purchase firearms legally in order "to protect their homes, themselves and their families, and for hunting and sport".

Personal life 
Hiral met her husband Kishore Tipirneni during the first year of medical school. They have two daughters and a son.

References

External links
 
 

21st-century American physicians
21st-century American politicians
21st-century American women politicians
American politicians of Indian descent
Arizona Democrats
Asian-American people in Arizona politics
Emergency medical technicians
Living people
Medical doctors from Mumbai
Ohio Democrats
Politicians from Mumbai
Women in Arizona politics
Youngstown State University alumni
1967 births
Candidates in the 2018 United States elections
Candidates in the 2020 United States elections